The 2010–11 NC State Wolfpack men's basketball team represented NC State University in the 2010–11 men's college basketball season. The team was coached by Sidney Lowe and played its home games at the RBC Center in Raleigh, NC. The Wolfpack is a member of the Atlantic Coast Conference.

Class of 2010 Commits

2010–11 Roster

2010–11 Schedule

|-
!colspan=9| Exhibition

|-
!colspan=9| Regular Season

|-
!colspan=9| ACC tournament
|-

References

Nc State
NC State Wolfpack men's basketball seasons
2010 in sports in North Carolina
2011 in sports in North Carolina